Ludwig Wilhelm Emil Ernst Becker FRSE (1860 – 1947) was Regius Professor of Astronomy at the University of Glasgow from 1893 until 1935 when he retired.

Life

Born in Wesel, Germany, Becker was educated at the University of Bonn. After two years as an assistant in the Berlin Observatory, the Earl of Crawford and Balcarres appointed him in 1885 to take charge of his large private observatory at Dunecht, near Aberdeen. When that institution was wound up in the autumn of 1888, the instruments were passed on to the Lords Commissioners of the Treasury for a new Royal Observatory.  A site on Blackford Hill in Edinburgh was selected in 1889 and Becker was included on the staff. He was appointed to the Glasgow Chair of Astronomy four years later.

Ludwig was a popular lecturer at Glasgow and it was claimed that his classes were better attended than those of any other astronomy course in the United Kingdom.

His research areas were extensive and he was a master of celestial mechanics. They included;
 investigation on the distribution of blue-violet light in the solar corona at the eclipse of 30 August 1905, in Tunisia;
 a long and careful investigation on the constant of aberration undertaken with the Glasgow Transit Circle; 
 a capture hypothesis relating to Binary stars, in which he showed how such a system could capture a third star, losing in the process one of its own components, and how the hypothesis could account for the high eccentricities of binary star orbits.

Ludwig retired from the Chair of Astronomy in 1935. He left the University Observatory well equipped for contemporary needs, and in his earlier years he added significantly to its instrument collection.

He died in Lagundo in Italy.

Anti-German sentiment
Although Becker had become a naturalized British citizen in 1892 before his appointment to Glasgow, this fact failed to save him from embarrassment and unmerited suspicion during the Great War; local public opinion forced his absence from the University.  He retired to seclusion in Aviemore, the Highlands, where he lived until the end of hostilities. This period had a negative effect upon his output in the post-war years.  W.M. Smart records that, "Becker was one of the gentlest of men, modest and retiring in disposition and, whatever the outside world thought, respected and esteemed by his students both for his learning and his kindly qualities."

References

 Glasgow University Magazine 15 February 1899 Ludwig Becker Cartoon & Poem
 Testimonials in Favour of Ludwig Becker, Candidate for the Chair of Practical Astronomy in the University of Glasgow
 Ludwig Becker Obituary MNRAS 1948 Vol 108 Page 41
 Ludwig Becker Obituary Nature 161, 161–161 (31 January 1948)
 University of Glasgow Story  Ludwig Becker

1860 births
1947 deaths
20th-century British astronomers
20th-century Scottish scientists
Academics of the University of Glasgow
Scottish astronomers
Scottish mathematicians